Balko is a German TV detective series.

Balko may also refer to:
 Balko, Oklahoma, US
 Radley Balko (born 1975), American libertarian journalist
 Callista Balko (born 1986), softball player